The Type Kō prototype automatic rifle (Japanese: 試製自動小銃甲号 Shisei Jidō Shōjū Kō Gō) was a semi-automatic rifle developed by the Empire of Japan during the 1930s. Its design is heavily based on the Pedersen rifle.

References 

Semi-automatic rifles
Trial and research firearms of Japan
Gas-operated firearms
Weapons and ammunition introduced in 1933